Raheb is a Lebanese salad with aubergines, eggplant, and tomatoes, often served as part of a selection of mezze. Raheb is Arabic for "monk."

Nutritional information
A typical recipe of raheb has the following nutritional values per serving:

 Calories: 292
 Total fat (g): 27
 Saturated fat (g): 4
 Cholesterol (mg): 0
 Carbohydrates (g): 13
 Protein (g): 2

See also

List of Arab salads

References

Salads
Lebanese cuisine
Middle Eastern cuisine